Dillington Carr is a  biological Site of Special Scientific Interest north of Dereham in Norfolk.

This valley in a tributary of the River Wensum has extensive irrigation reservoirs and areas of carr woodland. An outstanding variety of birds breed on the site, including gadwalls,  great crested grebe and tufted ducks on the reservoirs and barn owls, lesser spotted woodpeckers and willow tit in the woodland.

The site is private land with no public access.

References

Sites of Special Scientific Interest in Norfolk